"God Is in This Story" is a song by American contemporary Christian music musicians Katy Nichole and Big Daddy Weave, released on June 10, 2022, as the second single from her debut extended play, Katy Nichole (2022). Nichole co-wrote the song with Ethan Hulse and Jeff Pardo.

"God Is in This Story" peaked at number one on the US Hot Christian Songs chart, becoming Nichole's second and Big Daddy Weave's third chart-topping single.

Background
On June 10, 2022, Nichole and Big Daddy Weave released the single "God Is In This Story". The song follows the release of Nichole's breakthrough number one hit single, "In Jesus Name (God of Possible)". "God Is In This Story" was jointly promoted to Christian radio in the United States by Centricity Music and Word Entertainment, impacting radio stations on July 15, 2022.

Writing and development
Nichole shared the story behind the song, saying it was based on an interaction with someone who suggested she write about how "God was in the details".

Nichole co-wrote the song with Ethan Hulse and Jeff Pardo, then went on to share the song with Big Daddy Weave having formed a relationship during as she joining them on select dates during their spring 2022 tour.

Composition

Critical reception
Reviewing for 365 Days Of Inspiring Media, Jonathan Andre gave a positive opinion of the song. Kelly Meade of Today Christian Entertainment wrote a favourable review of the song.

Commercial performance
"God Is in This Story" debuted at number 31 on the Christian Airplay chart dated July 2, 2022. The following week, the song debuted at number 31 on the US Hot Christian Songs chart dated February 12, 2022, concurrently maintaining its position at number 26 on the Christian Airplay chart, and debuting at number four on the Christian Digital Song Sales chart. The song peaked at number one on the Hot Christian Songs chart dated October 15, 2022. "God Is in This Story" become Nichole's second Hot Christian Songs chart-topping single after "In Jesus Name (God of Possible)", while being Big Daddy Weave's third number one after the 2012 single "Redeemed" and the 2007 single "Every Time I Breathe". "God Is in This Story" reached number one on the Christian Airplay chart dated October 29, 2022, becoming Nichole's second Christian Airplay chart-topping single, and the seventh Christian Airplay number one single for Big Daddy Weave.

Music videos
On June 10, 2022, Katy Nichole released the official lyric video for the piano version of the song through YouTube.

On July 6, 2022, Katy Nichole released the official music video for "In Jesus Name (God of Possible)" on YouTube. The music video was directed by Diego Brawn and produced by Velasco Visuals.

Track listing
All tracks are produced by Jeff Pardo.

Personnel
Adapted from AllMusic.
 Jacob Arnold — drums, percussion
 Chris Bevins — editing
 Big Daddy Weave — primary artist, vocals
 Mike Cervantes — mastering
 Court Clement — acoustic guitar, Bouzouki, electric guitar, guitar, mandolin, Pedal Steel guitar
 Nickie Conley — background vocals
 Jason Eskridge — background vocals
 Tony Lucido — bass
 John Mays — A&R
 Wil Merrell — background vocals
 Sean Moffitt — Mixing
 Katy Nichole — background vocals, primary artist, vocals
 Jeff Pardo — background vocals, keyboards, piano, producer, programming, synthesizer bass
 Kiley Phillips — background vocals

Charts

Weekly charts

Year-end charts

Release history

References

External links
 

2022 singles
2022 songs
Katy Nichole songs
Big Daddy Weave songs
Songs written by Katy Nichole
Songs written by Ethan Hulse
Songs written by Jeff Pardo
Contemporary Christian songs